Kieran Fitzgerald may refer to:

 Kieran Fitzgerald, director of the 2007 American documentary film The Ballad of Esequiel Hernandez
 Kieran Fitzgerald (Gaelic footballer) (born 1981), Gaelic footballer from County Galway, Republic of Ireland